The following are the regional reptiles lists by continent.

Continent

Africa
Canary Islands
Democratic Republic of the Congo
Egypt
Ghana
Lesotho
Madagascar
Morocco

Asia
South Asia
Korean Peninsula
Afghanistan
China
India
Kaziranga National Park
Nepal
Iran
Israel
Lebanon
Mongolia
Pakistan
Sri Lanka
Singapore
Turkey

Oceania
Australia
Tasmania
Western Australia
Houtman Abrolhos
Recherche Archipelago

Europe
the Aegean
Bulgaria
Cyprus
Finland
France
Great Britain
Ireland
Italy
Latvia
Poland
Portugal
Spain
Sweden
Gibraltar

North America
North America north of Mexico
Canada
United States
Alabama
Arizona
Arkansas
California
South Carolina
Colorado
Florida
Georgia
Idaho
Indiana
Indiana Dunes
Iowa
Kansas
Massachusetts
Michigan
Minnesota
Missouri
Montana
New Jersey
North Carolina
Oklahoma
South Dakota
Texas
Washington
Olympic National Park
West Virginia
Wyoming
Yellowstone National Park

Caribbean
Anguilla
Antigua and Barbuda
Barbados
Cuba
Dominica
Grenada
Grenadines
Guadeloupe
Martinique
Montserrat
Puerto Rico
Saba
Saint Barthélemy
Saint Kitts and Nevis
Saint Lucia
Saint Martin
Saint Vincent
Sint Eustatius
Central America
Costa Rica
Guatemala

South America
Brazil
Colombia

See also
 Herpetology
 

Lists by region